Wang Weifan (1927–2015) was an evangelical Christian leader of the state-sanctioned Protestant church of mainland China, the Three-Self Patriotic Movement. He was well-loved as a preacher, theologian, and devotional writer.

Biography 
Wang Weifan was born into a non-Christian home in Taizhou, Jiangsu province. He became a Christian in 1947 while studying Chinese literature at National Central University in Nanjing and became active in InterVarsity Christian Fellowship. Wang would go onto further studies in China Theological Seminary in Hangzhou, which would later merge with Nanjing Union Theological Seminary in 1952. He would graduate from Nanjing Union Theological Seminary three years later in 1955.

Wang would be criticized during the Anti-Rightist Movement in 1958 and, later, during the Cultural Revolution.

After public religious practice was allowed again in China following the end of the Cultural Revolution, Wang taught New Testament at Nanjing Union Theological Seminary and was the head of the publications department.

Wang Weifan died on September 15, 2015, in Nanjing.

Theology 
Wang Weifan's theological thinking brought together Chinese classical thought and traditional western theology. Borrowing from the Yijing, he was known for his idea of the "ever-generating God":

Like other leaders of the Three-Self Patriotic Movement such as K. H. Ting, Wang also spoke of a cosmic Christology, with a strong emphasis on the Incarnation, and held to a Christocentric mysticism.

Due to his evangelical theology, Wang Weifan would in the 1990s be pushed into retirement during the "theological reconstruction movement" by his friend and colleague K. H. Ting.

Works

References

1927 births
2015 deaths
Chinese evangelicals
Chinese Christian theologians
Chinese Protestant ministers and clergy
Christian writers
Chinese spiritual writers
Three-Self Patriotic Movement